The 2017 Esso Cup was Canada's ninth national women's midget hockey championship, contested April 23–29, 2017 at Morden, Manitoba. This was the first time that the Esso Cup tournament was played in Manitoba. All games were played at the 1,200-seat Huron Window Corporation Arena, located inside Morden's Access Events Centre. The St. Albert Slash won the gold medal with a 1-0 overtime victory over the Harfangs du Triolet.

Teams

Round robin

Playoffs

Individual awards
 Most Valuable Player: Halle Oswald (Pembina Valley)
 Top Scorer: Kate Gallant (Durham West)
 Top Forward: Chloe Gendreau (Triolet)
 Top Defenceman: Katelyn Heppner (Pembina Valley)
 Top Goaltender: Camryn Drever (St. Albert)
 Most Sportsmanlike Player: Kate Gallant (Durham West)

Road to the Esso Cup

Atlantic Region
Mid Isle Wildcats advance by winning regional tournament March 30–April 2, 2017.

Quebec
LHFDQ Midget AAA championship was played April 14–16, 2017.

Ontario
The OWMA midget championship was played April 6–9, 2017 at Toronto, Ontario

Western Region
Prince Albert Bears advance by winning series played March 31–April 2, 2017 in Prince Albert, Saskatchewan (series location alternates by province each year).

Pacific Region
St. Albert Slash advance by winning series played March 31–April 2, 2017 in St. Albert, Alberta (series location alternates by province each year).

See also
 Esso Cup

References

External links
 2017 Esso Cup Home Page at HockeyCanada.com

Esso Cup
Esso Cup
Esso Cup 2017
Esso Cup 2017
2017 in Manitoba